Day Spring is a spring on the southeast slope of Cedar Mountain in southeastern Iron County, Utah, United States.

Day Spring was named for Thomas Day, a local shepherd.

See also

References

Bodies of water of Iron County, Utah
Springs of Utah